Mina Weinstein-Evron is an Israeli archaeologist. She is a professor of archaeology at University of Haifa. Evron joined the faculty at University of Haifa as the head of the department of archaeology in 1991. She researches the prehistory of the Levant and Old World, palynology of the Eastern Mediterranean and Old World, the Quaternary period, and the agricultural revolution, including food production and sedentism. Evron completed a B.A. in social work, cum laude, at Bar-Ilan University in 1973. She earned a B.A. in archaeology and prehistory, cum laude, at Tel Aviv University (TAU). In 1976, she earned an M.A. in palynology and prehistory, summa cum laude, from TAU. She completed her Ph.D. in palynology in 1984 at TAU.

Weinstein-Evron has co-directed excavations at El Wad Terrace since 1994.

References

External links 
 

Living people
Year of birth missing (living people)
Bar-Ilan University alumni
Tel Aviv University alumni
Academic staff of the University of Haifa
Israeli archaeologists
Israeli women archaeologists
20th-century archaeologists
21st-century archaeologists